Patchel Run is a stream in the U.S. state of Pennsylvania. It is a tributary to French Creek.

Patchel Run was named after Edward Patchel, an early settler.

Variant names
According to the Geographic Names Information System, it has also been known historically as:  
 Patchell Run
 Patcher Run

Course
Patchel Run rises on the Wolf Run divide about 2 miles northwest of Galloway, Pennsylvania.  Patchel Run then flows south to meet French Creek at Foster Corner, Pennsylvania.

Watershed
Patchel Run drains  and has an average annual flow of 5.99 cfs (cubic feet/second).  Rainfall averages 44.5 in (1,130.99 mm) per year.  About 79% of the watershed is forested.

See also 
 List of rivers of Pennsylvania
 List of tributaries of the Allegheny River

References

Additional Images

Rivers of Pennsylvania
Rivers of Venango County, Pennsylvania
Tributaries of the Allegheny River